Verticordia etheliana var. formosa is a flowering plant in the myrtle family, Myrtaceae and is endemic to the south-west of Western Australia. It is a compact shrub similar to var. etheliana but with smaller leaves and flowers.

Description
Verticordia etheliana var. formosa is a compact, sometimes almost prostrate shrub with horizontal branches.

Flowering time is from July to November or December.

Taxonomy and naming
Verticordia etheliana was first formally described by Charles Gardner in 1942 and the description was published in the Journal of the Royal Society of Western Australia. In 1991, Alex George undertook a review of the genus Verticordia and described two varieties of V. etheliana including this one. The type collection was made by George and Elizabeth George (Berndt) near Yuna and the name formosa "is derived form the Latin formosus (well formed, handsome) in reference to the more compact, showy habit of this variety".

Distribution and habitat
This variety grows in sand over hard claypan in heath and tall open shrubland between the Billabong Roadhouse and Kalbarri National Park and eastwards towards Yuna and Mullewa, in the Avon Wheatbelt,  Geraldton Sandplains and Yalgoo biogeographic regions.

Conservation
Verticordia etheliana var. formosa is classified as "not threatened" by the Western Australian Government Department of Parks and Wildlife.

Use in horticulture
This variety has been more difficult to propagate than var. etheliana, but its low compact form, the colour of its new growth and the delicately-perfumed bright red flower clusters indicate its horticultural merit. Some plants have survived in cultivation for more than 14 years and once established, have been hardy plants. They require well-drained soil over a moisture-retaining substrate and a sunny position protected from cold winds.

References

etheliana
Rosids of Western Australia
Eudicots of Western Australia
Plants described in 1991